The Fläscherberg (also known as Regitzer Spitz) is a mountain of the Rätikon, overlooking the Rhine in the Swiss canton of Graubünden. The closest locality is Fläsch on the southern side of the mountain.

At the northern foot of the mountain is the border with Liechtenstein, and the town of Balzers.

References

External links
 Fläscherberg on Hikr

Mountains of Switzerland
Mountains of Graubünden
Mountains of the Alps
One-thousanders of Switzerland